Mahmoud Ahmad Abbas (born 20 January 1978) is an Egyptian cyclist. He competed in the men's individual road race at the 2000 Summer Olympics.

References

1978 births
Living people
Cyclists at the 2000 Summer Olympics
Egyptian male cyclists
Olympic cyclists of Egypt